Sardegna was the third of three  ironclad battleships built for the Italian Regia Marina (Royal Navy). The ship, named for the island of Sardinia, was laid down in La Spezia in October 1885, launched in September 1890, and completed in February 1895. She was armed with a main battery of four  guns and had a top speed of —albeit at the cost of armor protection—and she was one of the first warships to be equipped with a wireless telegraph.

Sardegna spent the first decade of her career in the Active Squadron of the Italian fleet. Thereafter, she was transferred to the Reserve Squadron, and by 1911, she was part of the Training Division. She took part in the Italo-Turkish War of 1911–1912, where she escorted convoys to North Africa and supported Italian forces ashore by bombarding Ottoman troops. During World War I, Sardegna served as the flagship of the naval forces defending Venice against a possible attack from the Austro-Hungarian Navy, which did not materialize. After the city became threatened following the Battle of Caporetto in November 1917, the ship was withdrawn to Brindisi and later Taranto, where she continued to serve as a guard ship. She took part in Allied operations in Turkey in 1919–1922, and after returning to Italy in 1923, she was broken up for scrap.

Design

The ship had an inverted bow with a ram below the waterline. She was fitted with a single military mast located amidships, which had fighting tops for some of the light guns. The ship's superstructure included a conning tower forward and a secondary conning tower further aft. She had a crew of 794 officers and men. Sardegna was one of the first warships equipped with Guglielmo Marconi's new wireless telegraph.

Her propulsion system consisted of a pair of triple-expansion steam engines, each driving a single screw propeller, with steam supplied by eighteen coal-fired, cylindrical fire-tube boilers. The boilers were vented through three funnels, two placed side by side just aft of the conning tower and the third much further aft. She was the first Italian warship to be equipped with triple expansion engines.

Sardegna was armed with a main battery of four  30-caliber guns, mounted in two twin-gun turrets, one on either end of the ship. She carried a secondary battery of eight  40-cal. guns placed singly in shielded mounts atop the upper deck, with four on each broadside. Close-range defense against torpedo boats was provided by a battery of sixteen  guns in casemates in the upper deck, eight on each broadside. These were supported by twenty  43-cal. guns and ten  guns. As was customary for capital ships of the period, she carried five  torpedo tubes in above-water launchers. 

The ship was lightly armored for her size.

Service history

Sardegna was named after the island of Sardinia. She was built by the Arsenale di La Spezia in La Spezia, with her keel being laid down on 24 October 1885. She was launched on 20 September 1890, and completed on 16 February 1895. After entering service, Sardegna was assigned to the 2nd Division of the Reserve Squadron as its flagship, along with the older ironclad  and the torpedo cruiser . At the time, the ships of the Reserve Squadron were based in La Spezia. Later that year, the squadron stopped in Germany for the celebration held to mark the opening of the Kaiser Wilhelm Canal. While there, Sardegna accidentally ran aground in front of the canal, blocking the entrance for several days.

For 1903, the Active Squadron was on active service for seven months, with the rest of the year spent with reduced crews. In 1904–1905, Sardegna and her sisters were in service with the Active Squadron, which was kept in service for nine months of the year, with three months in reduced commission. The following year, the ships were transferred to the Reserve Squadron, along with the three s and the ironclad , three cruisers, and sixteen torpedo boats. This squadron only entered active service for two months of the year for training maneuvers, and the rest of the year was spent with reduced crews. Sardegna was still in the Reserve Squadron in 1908, along with her two sisters and the two s. By this time, the Reserve Squadron was kept in service for seven months of the year.

Italo-Turkish War

On 29 September 1911, Italy declared war on the Ottoman Empire in order to seize Libya. At the time, Sardegna and her two sisters were assigned to the Training Division, along with the old armored cruiser , under the command of Rear Admiral Raffaele Borea Ricci D'Olmo. On 3–4 October, Sardegna and her sisters were tasked with bombarding Fort Sultanje, which was protecting the western approach to Tripoli. The ships used their 6-inch guns to attack the fort to preserve their stock of 13.5-inch shells. By the morning of the 4th, the ships' gunfire had silenced the guns in the fort, allowing landing forces to go ashore and capture the city. The ships of the Training Division thereafter alternated between Tripoli and Khoms to support the Italian garrisons in the two cities; this included repulsing a major Ottoman attack on Tripoli over 23–26 October, where Sardegna and Sicilia supported the Italian left flank against concerted Ottoman assaults. During this engagement, Sardegna used a spotter aircraft to help direct the fire of her guns, the first time aircraft had been used in that role. Sardenga and her sisters arrived back in La Spezia, where they had their ammunition and supplies replenished.

In May 1912, the Training Division patrolled the coast, but saw no action. The following month, Sardegna and her sisters, along with six torpedo boats, escorted a convoy carrying an infantry brigade to Buscheifa, one of the last ports in Libya still under Ottoman control. The Italian force arrived off the town on 14 June and made a landing; after taking the city, the Italian forces then moved on to Misrata. Sardegna and the rest of the ships continued supporting the advance until the Italians had secured the city on 20 July. The Training Division then returned to Italy, where they joined the escort for another convoy on 3 August, this time to Zuara, the last port in Ottoman hands. The ships covered the landing two miles east of Zuara two days later, which was joined by supporting attacks from the west and south. With the capture of the city, Italy now controlled the entire Libyan coast. On 14 October the Ottomans agreed to sign a peace treaty to end the war.

Later career

Italy had declared neutrality at the start of World War I, but by July 1915, the Triple Entente had convinced the Italians to enter the war against the Central Powers. Admiral Paolo Thaon di Revel, the Italian naval chief of staff, believed that the threat from Austro-Hungarian submarines and naval mines in the narrow waters of the Adriatic was too serious for him to use the fleet in an active way. Instead, Revel decided to implement a blockade at the relatively safer southern end of the Adriatic with the main fleet, while smaller vessels, such as the MAS boats, conducted raids on Austro-Hungarian ships and installations. For their part, the Austro-Hungarians adopted a similar strategy, as they too were unwilling to risk the heavy units of their fleet. She was the flagship for the Northern Adriatic Naval Forces after Italy entered the war. The Northern Adriatic Naval Forces also included the two old Ammiraglio di Saint Bon-class battleships, two cruisers, and several smaller craft. The ships were tasked with defending Venice from Austro-Hungarian attacks; this service lasted until 15 November 1917. Since neither the Italians or Austro-Hungarians were willing to risk the main units of their fleets, Sardegna had an uneventful career during the war.

The ship was thereafter transferred to Brindisi for use as a harbor defense ship. The reason for her withdrawal was the major Italian defeat at the Battle of Caporetto; the German and Austro-Hungarian advance threatened to continue to Venice. Here, all of her secondary and light guns were removed, leaving her with only her main battery guns. She was equipped with a small battery of anti-aircraft guns, consisting of four  /40 guns and two machine guns. On 10 June 1918, Sardegna was moved to Taranto, where she continued serving as a guard ship. She took part in Allied operations in Constantinople after the end of the war, from 7 November 1919 to 5 April 1922. The ship did not remain in service long after returning to Italy. She was stricken on 4 January 1923 and subsequently broken up for scrap.

Footnotes

References
 
 
 
 Brassey, Thomas A., ed. (1908). The Naval Annual (Portsmouth: J. Griffin & Co.).
 
 
 
 
 Neal, William George, ed. (1896). The Marine Engineer (London: Office for Advertisements and Publication) XVII.

Further reading

External links

 Sardegna (1890) Marina Militare website

Re Umberto-class battleships
World War I battleships of Italy
1890 ships
Ships built in La Spezia